Anthony Johannes Joseph Maria Beks (born 12 July 1967) is a former breaststroke swimmer from New Zealand, who competed for his native country at the 1988 Summer Olympics in Seoul, South Korea. There he was eliminated in the qualifying heats of the 100m and 200m Breaststroke. He was born in Christchurch.

External links
 Profile on NZ Olympic Committee

1967 births
Living people
Olympic swimmers of New Zealand
Swimmers at the 1988 Summer Olympics
New Zealand male breaststroke swimmers
Swimmers from Christchurch
20th-century New Zealand people
21st-century New Zealand people